Mahilyowskaya is a Minsk Metro station. It was opened on 5 September 2001.

Gallery

References 

Minsk Metro stations
Railway stations opened in 2001